ML is a 2018 Philippine independent psychological horror film written and directed by Benedict Mique Jr., starring Eddie Garcia as a retired METROCOM Colonel suffering from Alzheimer's disease, leading him to believe that he is still living in the days of Ferdinand Marcos' dictatorship.  He mistakes a visiting student, played by Tony Labrusca, as a dissident resisting Martial Law, and captures and tortures him, just as he did back in the 1970s.  The film was released on August 3, 2018, at the 14th Cinemalaya Independent Film Festival.

Along with Kip Oebanda's Liway, it is one of two Cinemalaya 2018 films featuring social commentary about the martial law, continuing the tradition of 2017's Respeto in light of the 2016 burial of Ferdinand Marcos and the rise of his children Bongbong and Imee Marcos in Philippine politics.

Plot 
Carlo (Tony Labrusca), a Marcos loyalist, interviews retired Colonel Jose Z. Dela Cruz (Eddie Garcia) at his home about his experience and service under the Marcos regime during the martial law days for a school assignment. Unbeknownst to Carlo, the Colonel is delusional and psychopathic, believing that he is still an active-duty soldier in the dictatorship.

As Carlo starts interviewing the Colonel, he strikes Carlo unconscious. When Carlo wakes up, he finds himself strapped on a chair in the basement. Confused of what was happening, he demands to be cut loose by the Colonel but is only answered with physical battery. He is later tortured in numerous ways by the Colonel while asking him questions about his supposed links with a dissident movement. His best friend Jace and girlfriend Pat are later lured into the same basement through deceiving text messages. All three of them are tortured in front of each other. Both Carlo and Jace are beaten-up and electrocuted. Jace is water-boarded and later murdered by Russian-roulette. Pat is stripped naked, tied up, burned with cigarettes on her private parts and sexually violated with a bottle.

Jace's corpse is dumped on a pavement and framed as a drug dealer in Duterte's drug war. Carlo and Pat manage to escape the basement but are met at the doorstep by the Colonel, who is about to kill them before being distracted by a call, upon which the couple escape. They report their case to the police but the Colonel Dela Cruz cleans his house of evidence, ensuring his acquittal.

Hungry for justice, Carlo goes back to the Colonel's home one night to kill him, only to find that he has already died in his sleep. The Colonel is buried with honors at the Libingan ng mga Bayani.

Cast 
 Eddie Garcia as Colonel dela Cruz
 Tony Labrusca as Carlo
 Lianne Valentin as Pat
 Henz Villaraiz as Jace
 Jojit Lorenzo
 Rafa Siguion-Reyna
 Chanel Latorre
 Chrome Cosio
 Jindric Macapagal

See also 
 List of films about martial law in the Philippines
 Philippine Constabulary Metropolitan Command
 14th Cinemalaya Independent Film Festival
 Cinemalaya Independent Film Festival
 Liway
 Respeto

References

External links 
 

2018 films
Filipino-language films
Cinemalaya films
Philippine independent films
Presidency of Ferdinand Marcos